Arthur George Hickman (June 13, 1886 – January 16, 1930) was a drummer, pianist, and bandleader of one of the first big bands.

Career
Hickman founded a sextet in San Francisco in 1913. The band's first job was playing at training camp for the baseball team the San Francisco Seals. Next it was hired to perform at the St. Francis Hotel. Popularity allowed Hickman to expand his sextet and hire Ben Black, Earl Burtnett, Fred Coffman, Clyde Doerr, Steve Douglas, Frank Ellis, Dick Noolan, Ed Fitzpatrick, Jess Fitzpatrick, Roy Fox, Ray Hoback, Vic King, Lou Marcasie, Hank Miller, Mark Moica, Bert Ralton, Juan Ramos, Forrest Ray, Walt Rosener, Bela Spiller, Dick Winfree.

In 1915, they performed at the world's fair in San Francisco. Four years later they were hired by Florenz Ziegfeld Jr. to play at his nightclub on the roof of the New Amsterdam Theatre in New York City. During the next year, they accompanied the Ziegfeld Follies. Hickman's orchestra went back to California and played again at the St. Francis Hotel and the Ambassador Hotel in Los Angeles. After Hickman retired, the band was led by Frank Ellis. Hickman's "Rose Room" became a big band standard.

Influence

Before Paul Whiteman, Hickman's dance orchestra was one of the first to use elements of jazz and one of the first to use a saxophone section. The bands instruments also included violin, trumpet, trombone, reeds (2), banjo (2), double bass, and piano, with Hickman on second piano and drums.

Jelly Roll Morton disputed the notion that Hickman's orchestra was one of the first big bands.

In 2004, Archeophone Records released The San Francisco Sound, an album that contains nearly all of Hickman's recordings from Sept. 15, 1919 to July 8, 1920. Clyde Doerr plays alto and baritone saxophone. Bert Ralton plays soprano saxophone, tenor saxophone, oboe, and English horn.

Discography
 The San Francisco Sound (Archeophone, 2004)

References

External links

 Art Hickman recordings at the Discography of American Historical Recordings.
 Article by Bruce Vermazen
 Art Hickman and his Orchestra Red Hot Jazz Archive

1886 births
1930 deaths
Musicians from Oakland, California
American bandleaders
Big band bandleaders
Vaudeville performers